Union Sportive Municipale Montargis is a French sports club. They are based in the town of Montargis and their home stadium is the Stade Maurice Beraud. As of the 2017–18 season, the club's association football team plays in the Championnat National 3, the fifth tier of French football.

Current squad

External links
USM Montargis club information at fff.fr 

Football clubs in France
1919 establishments in France
Association football clubs established in 1919
Sport in Loiret
Football clubs in Centre-Val de Loire